Bergenheim is a surname. Notable people with the name include:

 Edvard Bergenheim (1798–1884), Finnish Archbishop of Turku
 Richard Bergenheim (1948–2008), American editor of the Christian Science Monitor
 Robert C. Bergenheim (1924–2010), American journalist and editor
 Sean Bergenheim (born 1984), Finnish ice hockey winger